The 2021–22 Coupe de France preliminary rounds, Occitanie was the qualifying competition to decide which teams from the leagues of the Occitanie region of France took part in the main competition from the seventh round.

A total of ten teams qualified from the Occitanie preliminary rounds. In 2020–21, Canet Roussillon FC progressed furthest in the competition, reaching the quarter-finals, beating Marseille along the way, before losing to Montpellier.

Draws and fixtures
On 9 July 2021, the league announced that 509 teams had entered from the region. On 23 July 2021, the draw for the first two rounds was published. As in previous seasons, the draw for these rounds was made within individual districts of the league, with a few teams being drawn out of district to ensure a balanced draw. 424 teams entered at the first round stage, from the District leagues and Régional 3. A further 66 teams from Régional 2 and Régional 1 entered at the second round stage. The third round draw, which saw the entry of the Championnat National 3 teams from the region, was published on 17 September 2021. The fourth round draw, which saw the entry of the Championnat National 2 teams, was published on 23 September 2021. The fifth round draw, which saw the entry of the single Championnat National team in the region, was made on 6 October 2021. The sixth round draw was published on 20 October 2021.

First round
These matches are from the Ariège district, and were played on 28 and 29 August 2021.

These matches are from the Aude district, and were played on 29 August 2021.

These matches are from the Aveyron district, were played on 28 and 29 August 2021.

These matches are from the Gard-Lozère district, and were played on 27, 28 and 29 August 2021.

These matches are from the Haute-Garonne district, and were played on 28 and 29 August 2021.

These matches are from the Gers district, and were played on 27, 28 and 29 August 2021.

These matches are from the Hérault district, and were played on 28 and 29 August 2021.

These matches are from the Lot district, and were played on 28 and 29 August 2021.

These matches are from the Hautes-Pyrénées district, and were played on 27, 28 and 29 August 2021.

These matches are from the Pyrénées-Orientales district, were played on 29 August 2021.

These matches are from the Tarn district, and were played on 27, 28 and 29 August 2021.

These matches are from the Tarn-et-Garonne district, and were played on 28 and 29 August 2021.

Second round
These matches are from the Ariège district, and were played on 4 and 5 September 2021.

These matches are from the Aude district, and were played on 5 September 2021.

These matches are from the Aveyron district, and were played on 4 and 5 September 2021.

These matches are from the Gard-Lozère district, and were played on 5 September 2021.

These matches are from the Haute-Garonne district, and were played on 4 and 5 September 2021.

These matches are from the Gers district, and were played on 3, 4 and 5 September 2021.

These matches are from the Hérault district, and were played on 5 September 2021.

These matches are from the Lot district, and were played on 4 and 5 September 2021.

These matches are from the Hautes-Pyrénées district, and were played on 4 and 5 September 2021.

These matches are from the Pyrénées-Orientales district, and were played on 5 September 2021.

These matches are from the Tarn district, and were played on 3, 4 and 5 September 2021.

These matches are from the Tarn-et-Garonne district, and were played on 4 and 5 September 2021.

Third round
These matches were played on 17, 18 and 19 September 2021, with three postponed until 25 and 26 September 2021 and one postponed further to 3 October 2021.

Fourth round
These matches were played on 2 and 3 October 2021, with one postponed until 10 October 2021.

Fifth round
These were played on 16 and 17 October 2021.

Sixth round
These were played on 30 and 31 October 2021.

References

preliminary rounds